Signal regulatory protein α (SIRPα) is a regulatory membrane glycoprotein from SIRP family expressed mainly by myeloid cells and also by stem cells or neurons.

SIRPα acts as inhibitory receptor and interacts with a broadly expressed transmembrane protein CD47 also called the "don't eat me" signal. This interaction negatively controls effector function of innate immune cells such as host cell phagocytosis. SIRPα diffuses laterally on the macrophage membrane and accumulates at a phagocytic synapse to bind CD47 and signal 'self', which inhibits the cytoskeleton-intensive process of phagocytosis by the macrophage. This is analogous to the self signals provided by MHC class I molecules to NK cells via Ig-like or Ly49 receptors. NB. Protein shown to the right is CD47 not SIRP α.

Structure
The cytoplasmic region of SIRPα is highly conserved between rats, mice and humans. Cytoplasmic region contains a number of tyrosine residues, which likely act as ITIMs.  Upon CD47 ligation, SIRPα is phosphorylated and recruits phosphatases like SHP1 and SHP2. The extracellular region contains three Immunoglobulin superfamily domains – single V-set and two C1-set IgSF domains. SIRP β and γ have the similar extracellular structure but different cytoplasmic regions giving contrasting types of signals. SIRP α polymorphisms are found in ligand-binding IgSF V-set domain but it does not affect ligand binding. One idea is that the polymorphism is important to protect the receptor of pathogens binding.

Ligands 
SIRPα recognizes CD47, an anti-phagocytic signal that distinguishes live cells from dying cells. CD47 has a single Ig-like extracellular domain and five membrane spanning regions.  The interaction between SIRPα and CD47 can be modified by endocytosis or cleavage of the receptor, or interaction with surfactant proteins. Surfactant protein A and D are soluble ligands, highly expressed in the lungs, that bind to the same region of SIRPα as CD47 and can therefore competitively block binding.

Signalling 
The extracellular domain of SIRP α binds to CD47 and transmits intracellular signals through its cytoplasmic domain. CD47-binding is mediated through the NH2-terminal V-like domain of SIRP α. The cytoplasmic region contains four ITIMs that become phosphorylated after binding of ligand. The phosphorylation mediates activation of tyrosine kinase SHP2. SIRP α has been shown to bind also phosphatase SHP1, adaptor protein SCAP2 and FYN-binding protein. Recruitment of SHP phosphatases to the membrane leads to the inhibition of myosin accumulation at the cell surface and results in the inhibition of phagocytosis.

Cancer 
Cancer cells highly expressed CD47 that activate SIRP α and inhibit macrophage-mediated destruction. In one study, they engineered high-affinity variants of SIRP α that antagonized CD47 on cancer cells and caused increase phagocytosis of cancer cells. Another study (in mice) found anti-SIRPα antibodies helped macrophages to reduce cancer growth and metastasis, alone and in synergy with other cancer treatments.

References

Further reading

 
 

Clusters of differentiation